METAdrasi – Action for Migration and Development (Greek: ΜΕΤΑδραση - Δράση για τη Μετανάστευση και την Ανάπτυξη), commonly known as METAdrasi (pronounced: metaðɾasi), is a Greek non-profit civil society organisation that promotes the reception and integration of migrants and refugees in Greece.

Its provides  interpretation, the protection of unaccompanied and separated children, the support of other vulnerable groups, and the education and integration of refugees and migrants.

It was founded in December 2009 by Lora Pappa.

METAdrasi was the recipient of the 2019 Conrad N. Hilton Humanitarian Prize.

References 

Non-profit organizations based in Greece
Refugee aid organizations in Europe